Battling Marshal is a 1950 American western film directed by Oliver Drake and starring Sunset Carson, Pat Starling and Lee Roberts. It was distributed by the low-budget company Astor Pictures.

Main cast
 Sunset Carson as 	Marshal Sunset Carson
 Al Terry as Bob Turner
 Pat Starling as Jane Turner 
 Lee Roberts as 	Sidekick Lucky
 Cactus Jr. as Sunset's Horse

References

Bibliography
 Pitts, Michael R. Western Movies: A Guide to 5,105 Feature Films. McFarland, 2012.

External links
 

1950 films
1950 Western (genre) films
American Western (genre) films
Films directed by Oliver Drake
Astor Pictures films
1950s English-language films
1950s American films